Ibraheim Malcolm-Ramon Campbell (born May 13, 1992) is an American football safety who is a free agent. He played college football at Northwestern, and was drafted by the Cleveland Browns in the fourth round of the 2015 NFL Draft. Campbell has also played for the Houston Texans, Dallas Cowboys, New York Jets, Green Bay Packers, Tennessee Titans, and Indianapolis Colts.

Early years
Campbell grew up in Cheltenham Township, a township on the northern border of Philadelphia and attended Cheltenham public schools through 8th grade. Campbell then attended Chestnut Hill Academy in Philadelphia, Pennsylvania for high school, where he starred as both a running back and defensive back.

He rushed for 3,857 yards and 52 touchdowns during his career at running back. As a defensive back, he totalled 135 tackles and nine interceptions. He earned All-league (defensive back), All-state (running back), All-Southeastern Pennsylvania (running back) and All-city (defensive back) honors and was named to the Philadelphia Daily News' All-Decade team as a defensive back (26 players were honored on this team). He was named the Blue Devils' Offensive MVP. He had 1,885 yards and 28 touchdowns his senior season. He scored the game-winning TD vs. Haverford with a run in overtime that lifted CHA to the league championship. He was selected to play in Philadelphia's City All-Star game and Pennsylvania's East-West All-Star game, and was voted CHA's "Top Senior Athlete" in 2009–10.

Also a letterman in track & field, mostly in sprints and hurdles. He posted bests of 7.21 seconds in the 60 meters, 11.19 in the 100 meters, 8.60 in the 60m hurdles, 14.57 in the 110m hurdles and also 6.71 meters (22 ft) in the long jump.

Campbell was rated by Rivals.com as a three-star recruit. He committed to Northwestern University to play college football.

College career
Campbell accepted a football scholarship from Northwestern University. As a redshirt freshman, he became a starter at safety, posting 100 tackles (led the team), 3.5 tackles for loss, 2 interceptions, 4 passes defensed and one fumble recovery.

As a sophomore, he was one of the leaders of the defense, registering 89 tackles (fourth on the team), one interception and 12 passes defensed (led the team). As a junior, he tallied 74 tackles (fifth on the team), 2.5 tackles for loss, 1 sack, 4 interceptions (tied for the team lead) and one fumble recovery.

As a senior, he collected 54 tackles (sixth on the team), one tackle for loss, 3 interceptions (tied for the team lead). He finished his college career with 45 starts, 316 tackles, 7.5 tackles for loss, 11 interceptions (tied for third in school history), 24 passes defended (tied for fifth in school history), one sack and one fumble recovery.

Professional career

Cleveland Browns
Campbell was selected by the Cleveland Browns in the fourth round (115th overall) of the 2015 NFL Draft. On May 19, Campbell signed a four-year, $2.79 million contract with the Browns with a $512,010 signing bonus.

In 2016, he started 8 games at strong safety. In 2017, he appeared in 8 games (2 starts), before being waived/injured by the Browns and placed on the injured reserve list on November 9. He was released with an injury settlement on November 16.

Houston Texans
On December 13, 2017, Campbell was signed to the Houston Texans' practice squad. He was promoted to the active roster on December 19.

On September 1, 2018, Campbell was waived by the Texans.

Dallas Cowboys
On September 2, 2018, Campbell was claimed off waivers by the Dallas Cowboys. He was waived on October 9, 2018.

New York Jets
On October 24, 2018, Campbell was signed by the New York Jets. He was waived on November 2, 2018.

Green Bay Packers
On November 5, 2018, the Packers claimed Campbell off waivers to shore up the secondary after trading Ha Ha Clinton-Dix to the Washington Redskins. He was placed on injured reserve on December 4, 2018.

On August 8, 2019, Campbell was re-signed by the Packers. He was placed on the reserve/PUP list on August 31, 2019. He was activated off PUP on November 5. He made his 2019 debut on November 10 in a Week 10 victory over the Carolina Panthers, recording three solo tackles and a forced fumble.

Tennessee Titans
On May 1, 2020, Campbell was signed by the Tennessee Titans. He was released on September 5, 2020.

Indianapolis Colts
On September 9, 2020, Campbell was signed to the Indianapolis Colts practice squad. On September 22, Campbell was promoted to the active roster. He was released on October 17, and re-signed to the practice squad on October 20. He was elevated to the active roster on December 13 for the team's week 14 game against the Las Vegas Raiders, and reverted to the practice squad after the game. He was placed on the practice squad/COVID-19 list by the team on December 16, 2020, and restored to the practice squad on December 29. He was elevated again on January 2, 2021, for the week 17 game against the Jacksonville Jaguars, and reverted to the practice squad again following the game. On January 10, 2021, Campbell signed a reserve/futures contract with the Colts.

On August 31, 2021, Campbell was waived by the Colts. He re-signed with their practice squad on September 28, 2021.

NFL career statistics

References

External links

Northwestern Wildcats football bio

1992 births
Living people
People from Cheltenham, Pennsylvania
Sportspeople from Montgomery County, Pennsylvania
Players of American football from Philadelphia
American football safeties
Northwestern Wildcats football players
Cleveland Browns players
Houston Texans players
Dallas Cowboys players
New York Jets players
Green Bay Packers players
Tennessee Titans players
Indianapolis Colts players